Vandhoo (Dhivehi: ވަންދޫ) is one of the inhabited islands of Thaa Atoll.

History
According to some historical scripts, Vandhoo used to be an economical hub where ships travelled through Maldives, used to load and unload goods while transiting near Vandhoo lagoon in early days.

Geography

Demography

According to early census statistics, Vandhoo was one of the most populated islands in the atoll in 1911, when the total population numbered over 1,000. Due to poverty and government-initiated birth control programs, the population has since decreased to less than 300 in 2014.

References

External links
 Kinbidhoo News

Islands of the Maldives